Purnaiah (Purniya) (1746 – 27 March 1812), aka Krishnacharya Purniya or Mir Miran Purniya was an Indian Administrator and statesman and the 1st Diwan of Mysore. He has the rare distinction of governing under a sultan and a maharaja, Tipu and Krishnaraja Wadiyar III. He advised the monarchs of the Mysore kingdom from 1782 to 1811. He was known for his skill with accounts, prodigious memory and proficiency in several languages. He was also a wartime military commander while serving under Tipu Sultan. After Tipu Sultan's defeat, he served as the Diwan of Krishnaraja Wadiyar III. Krishnaraja was educated and trained by Purniah in his early years.

Early years and rise 
Purniah came from an orthodox Deshastha Madhva Brahmin family. He was born in 1746 CE. He lost his father at the age of eleven and had to seek employment to support his family. He started writing accounts at a trader's shop. This grocer had close contact with a rich merchant, Annadana Shetty, who supplied large quantities of groceries to Hyder Ali's palace and army. Their family were devout followers of Uttaradi Math.

Through this connection Purniah very soon earned confidence of Hyder Ali because of his proficiency in accounting and excellent handwriting. Endowed with prodigious memory, proficiency in several languages and sheer hard work, Purniah became head of Accounts Department and a confidant of the ruler.

Purniah was fluent in Kannada (mother tongue), Marathi, Sanskrit and Persian. He understood English, but could not read or write the language.

Years with Tipu 

In 1782, when Hyder Ali died, near Chittoor, Tipu was encamping in Malabar coast. Purniah kept the king's death a top secret, and sent the word to Tipu by the speediest way possible. Meanwhile, Hyder's body was kept embalmed, and business went on usual. Purniah thus played a key role in keeping the news of Hyder's death confidential, as many adversaries could have seized this advantage and tried to usurp throne. Purniah thus paved the way for the succession of Tipu. Purniah became a member of Tipu's inner cabinet.

Purniah attended every military campaign Tipu Sultan led. In the Third Anglo-Mysore War of 1792, Purniah commanded a rocket units (131 men). In his Battle of Seringapatam, Tipu had entrusted his eldest son and heir-apparent to Purniah's care. In the Fourth Anglo-Mysore War, Purniah commanded the forces of Mysore against the English in some of the battles including Battle of Sultanpet Tope. Tipu died on the battlefield in 1799.

British alliance 

After Tipu's death Purniah sought an interview with the Lord George Harris, who was very much impressed with Purniah's political acumen, maturity and fearlessness. He informed the General that administration had nearly collapsed, many of the able army and civil officers were killed and plundering had already set in.

Purniah continued to be Dewan of the Mysore under the Wadiyar dynasty and as a subsidiary alliance with the British. Queen Regent Lakshammanni readily agreed to the arrangement. The child-king, later Mummadi Krishnaraja Wodeyar III, was educated and trained by Purniah. He was granted the jagir of Yelandur, which yielded an annual revenue of 10000 star pagodas, by the Maharaja of Mysore at a special Durbar on 27 December 1807. The British Resident Sir John Malcolm and the East India Company honoured him on his retirement by presenting him a horse, an elephant and a rich killat.

Krishnaraja Wodeyar attained the age of 16 in early 1810 and hence attained the age of discretion. After discussing with the British Resident, A. H. Cole, the reins of the state were transferred from Dewan Purnaiah to the king. Purniah retired from service in 1811.

After his retirement from service in 1811, Purnaiah lived at the house is known as Lord Harris's House or The Doctor's Bungalow or Puraniah's Bungalow in Seringapatam, near the Scott’s Bungalow and Garrison Cemetery, and died there on 28 March 1812. Days before his death, he wrote a letter to his friend Col. Hill, Commandant of Seringapatam, Old and infirm, after a life of unusual activity and care, I am going to the land of my fathers, for which Col. Hill replied Say I am travelling the same road, and died a short time after Purnaiah. A tablet on the wall of this house records the connection of Lord Harris and Puraniah to this house.

The photo of the bungalow at Bangalore shown as that of Purniah is actually that of his grandson Sir P. N. Krishnamurti, who was also Dewan of Mysore during the first decade of the 1900s.  Purniah's bungalow is at Yelandoor, which is now a taluq headquarters at Chamaraja Nagar district. This Yelandoor bungalow is now developed as a museum for Dewan Purnaiah's memory by Karnataka Government.

Purniah was closely associated with Gen. Arthur Wellesley (Arthur Wellesley, 1st Duke of Wellington), when he was stationed in Mysore. American historian Prof. Robert Frykenberg suggests that Wellesley learned how to maximize the utility of cavalry from Purniah

Years with Wodeyars 

Purniah's first concern was law and order. He suppressed the revolting Palegars (local chieftains) who had become despots. He started releasing cash allowances to Mathas, temples and dargahs, which the British had stopped after Tippu Sultan's death. He opened a judicial department for peoples' complaints.

His public works have left a great legacy. About nine mile canal was dug to supply drinking water to Mysore. Several tanks were dug. A stone bridge, dedicated to Marquess of Wellesley, the Governor General of Bengal was constructed across river Kaveri connecting Srirangapattana with Kirangur. It has stood stead fast for the last two hundred years.

Large number of choultries were built in the name of Maharaja of Mysore, but people called them "Dewan Purniah's Chatras". They were available to all travelers.

Revenue administration was streamlined. Mysore state had a volatile border with incessant skirmishes, a legacy of the previous regime. Methodical land surveys were conducted. Borders were notified. Posts of Shekdars, Amaldars and Tehsildars were created which came down to modern times.

He was honoured with big grants and a large pension. His desire to make his position a hereditary one, just like that of a ruler, did not materialise.

Purniah is remembered for laying the foundation of sound administrative machinery for the state. Mysore came to be recognised as one of the foremost progressive native states in British India.

Personal life

Views 
Purnaiah and his family were devout followers of Uttaradi Matha and Dvaita Vedanta of Madhvacharya. Religion and spirituality were very important to Purnaiah. He was a contemporary and disciple of Satyadharma Tirtha of this Uttaradi Matha during his times.

In Popular Culture

Films and Television 

In 1988 Doordarshan Serial Bharat Ek Khoj produced and directed by Shyam Benegal also Picturised a Full One Episode on Tipu Sultan. The titular role of Purnaiah was played by Noted TV actor Vijay Kashyap.

In 1990, a television series, The Sword of Tipu Sultan was directed by Bollywood actor Sanjay Khan based on a historical novel by Bhagwan Gidwani. In that The titular role of Purnaiah was played by Noted TV actor Anant Mahadevan.

References

Bibliography 

 

Diwans of Mysore
1746 births
1812 deaths
Srirangapatna
Madhva Brahmins